Kellogg Point is a census-designated place (CDP) in the town of New Fairfield, Fairfield County, Connecticut, United States. It is in the southeast part of the town, on the western shore of Candlewood Lake.

Kellogg Point was first listed as a CDP prior to the 2020 census.

References 

Census-designated places in Fairfield County, Connecticut
Census-designated places in Connecticut